This is a list of films which placed number one at the weekly box office in the United States during 1959 per Variety's weekly National Boxoffice Survey. The results are based on a sample of 20-25 key cities and therefore, any box office amounts quoted may not be the total that the film grossed nationally in the week.

Number-one films

Highest-grossing films
The highest-grossing films during the calendar year based on theatrical rentals were as follows:

See also
 List of American films — American films by year
 Lists of box office number-one films

References

Chronology

1959
1959 in American cinema
1959-related lists